The Soutpansberg flat lizard (Platysaurus relictus) is a species of lizard in the Cordylidae family.

Description
The females and juveniles of this Platysaurus are brown on their backs and yellow on their tails. Adult males, however, are green-yellow on their bodies and blue on their neck and belly. There is a collar.

Geography
This lizard is endemic to South Africa, including Waterberg and Soutpansberg. Its habitat is savannah.

Habits
This is a quick and alert lizard, living on sandstone outcrops.

Conservation
The Soutpansberg flat lizard is a near-threatened species.

See also
 Platysaurus
 Cordylidae

References

External links
 More Information

Platysaurus
Reptiles of South Africa
Reptiles described in 1976
Taxa named by Donald George Broadley
Taxonomy articles created by Polbot